Prosvita is a society for preserving and developing Ukrainian culture and education among population that created in the nineteenth century in the Austria-Hungary Kingdom of Galicia and Lodomeria.

By the declaration of its founders, the movement was created as a counterbalance to anti-Ukrainian colonial and Russophile trends in Ukrainian society of the period.

History 

Prosvita was founded in 1868 in Lviv by 65 delegates from different regions and groups of intellectuals, mostly from the same city. Anatole Vakhnianyn was elected the first head of the Prosvita Society. By the end of 1913, Prosvita had 77 affiliate societies and 2,648 reading rooms.

In 1936 alone, when Western Ukraine with the city of Lviv were part of the Second Polish Republic, the Prosvita Society opened over 500 new outlets with full-time professional staff. By the end of the interwar period, Prosvita has grown to include 83 affiliates, 3,210 reading rooms, 1,207 premises, 3,209 libraries (with 688,186 books), 2,185 theater clubs, 1,115 choirs, 138 orchestras, and 550 study groups.

In 1939 the society was shut down and banned by the newly arrived Soviet rulers. Prosvita operated only in Western Europe and America up to 1988.  The first Prosvita society established in the United States was in Shenandoah, Pennsylvania in 1887.

The Prosvita Society was renewed in Ukraine during the Soviet period of Glasnost of 1988–89 as the Shevchenko Association of Ukrainian Language, and since then takes an active part in social life of independent Ukraine. In modern times it was headed by Dmytro Pavlychko and Pavlo Movchan (at present).

Currently, almost all higher education institutions in Ukraine have Prosvita affiliations with teachers and students as members. Also active are the Young Prosvita youth organizations.

During the 2014 pro-Russian conflict in Ukraine two Prosvita members were kidnapped and one was murdered by pro-Russian separatists in the Donetsk and Luhansk provinces.

Tasks 

Official goals of the Prosvita Society:
 Promoting Ukrainian language as the only state language in Ukraine
 Maintaining principles of humanity, mutual understanding, religious and civil consent in society
 Contributing to building and strengthening of Ukrainian state and its economic development
 Propagating economic, legal and other kind of knowledge
 Contributing to raising of Ukrainian language and culture authority abroad
 Preserving and revitalizing natural environment and biodiversity

Leaders

Kingdom of Galicia and Lodomeria
 1868-???? Anatole Vakhnianyn
 1906-1906 Yevhen Olesnytsky
 1906-1910 Petro Ohonovsky
 1910-1922 Ivan Kyvelyuk

Poland
 1922-1923 Ivan Bryk
 1923-1931 Mykhailo Halushchynsky
 1931-1939 Ivan Bryk

Chernigov Governorate
 1906-1911 Mykhailo Kotsyubynsky

Kharkov Governorate
 1912-???? (as ''Kvitka-Osnovianenko Association)

Yekaterinoslav Governorate
 1905-???? (as Ukrainian Association of Literature and Arts)

Podole Governorate
?

Don Host Oblast
 1907-1913 Zakhar Barabash

Ukraine
 1989-1990 Dmytro Pavlychko (as Shevchenko Association of Ukrainian Language)
 1990–present Pavlo Movchan (originally as Shevchenko Association of Ukrainian Language and since 1991 – Prosvita)

See also
 Hromada (secret society)
 Prosvjeta

References

 
Educational organizations established in 1868
Cultural organizations based in Ukraine
Ethnic organizations based in Austria-Hungary
Establishments in the Kingdom of Galicia and Lodomeria
Nationalism and the arts
Stateless nationalism in Europe
Language activists
Second Polish Republic
Resistance to the Russian Empire
Progressivism